Petr Jakeš (2 May 1940 in Břehy – 29 November 2005 in Prague) was a Czech geologist and geochemist. He dealt mainly with geochemical and volcanic processes on Earth and on celestial bodies, research on meteorites and lunar rocks.

1940 births
2005 deaths
People from Pardubice District
Czech geochemists